The Lake Pasteur Biodiversity Reserve is a proposed biodiversity reserve in the Côte-Nord region of Quebec, Canada.

Background

The Lake Pasteur Biodiversity Reserve was designated a proposed reserve in 2003.
The reserve would have IUCN management category II.
The responsible authority is the Quebec Ministère du Développement durable, de l'Environnement et de la Lutte contre les changements climatiques.

The boundaries of proposed reserve were given in 2005, including Lake Pasteur but excluding Lake Walker.

Location

The proposed Lake Pasteur biodiversity reserve is located in the Côte-Nord administrative region between latitude 50°08' and 50°27' north and longitude 66°50' and 67°15' west. 
The reserve would contain Lac Morin in the southeast, Lake Pasteur, Lake Chevarie, and most of Lake Walker in the west.
It would include part of the Pasteur River to the north of Lake Pasteur, but the northern boundary would exclude Lake Mouscoutchou and Lake Asquiche.

Environment

The proposed biodiversity reserve is in the Sainte Marguerite Plateau, a natural region in the Central Laurentian natural province.
The terrain is hilly, covered with glacial till.
A map of the Ecological regions of Quebec shows the area of the reserve belonging to the eastern spruce/moss domain of the boreal zone.
Vegetation includes moors, black spruce (Picea mariana) forests, some stands of balsam fir (Abies balsamea), and stands of paper birch (Betula papyrifera) and poplar (Populus tremuloides) in the northern part.
There are scattered peat bogs.
The proposed reserve has  of peatland.
The region is used by boreal woodland caribou, and the proposed reserve is in a caribou area of interest.

Human land use

The proposed biodiversity reserve is within the Port-Cartier–Sept-Îles Wildlife Reserve.
It is also in the Saguenay Beaver Reserve, where the Innu communities have special rights to hunt and trap fur animals.
The privately-owned Cartier Railway crosses the territory.
Under the Natural Heritage Conservation Act prohibited activities would include mining and extraction of oil and gas, forestry and production of hydroelectricity and other forms of energy.
Other prohibitions would include introducing native or exotic wildlife.
Introduction of fish for commercial purposes, or of non-native flora would require a permit.
Any changes affecting the natural drainage and flow of water, and water quality would also be prohibited.
Various other restrictions would apply, all aimed at preserving the natural environment.

Notes

Sources

Protected areas of Côte-Nord